Riva is an Italian surname.

Geographical distribution 
As of 2014, 57.8% of all known bearers of the surname Riva were residents of Italy (frequency 1:1,405), 7.1% of India (1:143,430), 5.3% of Brazil (1:51,231), 5.3% of Argentina (1:10,805), 4.5% of the Philippines (1:29,793), 4.1% of Bangladesh (1:52,025), 2.7% of the United States (1:174,602), 2.6% of Peru (1:16,250), 1.9% of France (1:47,539) and 1.5% of Switzerland (1:7,358). 

In Italy, the frequency of the surname was higher than national average (1:1,405) only in one region: Lombardy (1:281)

People 
 Aldo Riva (1923–?), Italian professional football player 
 Antonello Riva (born 1962), Italian former basketball player
 Antonio Riva (pilot) (1896-1951), Italian World War I flying ace
 Carlo Riva (1922–2017), Italian motorboat designer and builder
 Celso Riva (born c. 1974), Italian independent video game designer 
 César Humberto Chávez Riva Gálvez (born 1964), former Peruvian international footballer
 Diana-Maria Riva (born 1969), American actress
 Douglas Riva, American classical pianist
 Eddy Riva (born 1973), French race walker
 Emmanuelle Riva (1927-2017), French actress
 Ferdinando Riva (born 1930), Swiss retired footballer
 Fernanda Riva (1920–1956), Roman Catholic Nun of Canossian Daughter of Charity congregation
 Fil Bo Riva (born 1992 or 1993), Italian musician
 Gea Riva (born 1985), Italian actress
 Gigi Riva (born 1944), Italian former striker
 Giulia Riva (born 1992), Italian sprinter 
 Giuseppe Riva (1834-1916), Italian lawyer and painter
 Isabella Riva (1887-1985), Italian actress
 J. Michael Riva (1948-2012), American production designer
 Maggie de la Riva (born 1942), Filipino film actress and rape victim
 Manuel Riva, Romanian DJ and record producer
 Maria Riva (born 1924), German-born American actress, daughter of Marlene Dietrich
 Maria Luisa Riva (born 1978), Italian ski mountaineer
 Marianne dela Riva (born 1956), Filipino actress
 Mario Riva (1912-1960), Italian film actor
 Markus Riva, Latvian singer and producer, pseudonym of Miķelis Ļaksa 
 Oreste Riva (1860–1936), Italian composer
 Osvaldo Riva (born 1927), Italian wrestler
 Pedro Ipuche Riva (1924–1996), Uruguayan composer of classical music
 Peter Riva (born 1950), American literary agent and producer
 Pia Riva (born 1935), Italian skier
 Raphael Riva, or Raphael Ripa (died 1611), Italian Roman Catholic Bishop of Chioggia and Bishop of Korčula 
 Roberto Riva (born 1986), Italian artistic roller skater and ten-time world champion
 Ruggero Riva (born 1990), Italian professional football player 
 Sergio Riva (born 1983), Italian bobsledder
 Sílvia Riva González (born 1979), Andorran politician and notary

See also 
 Antonio Riva Palacio (1926–2014), Mexican lawyer and politician
 Mariano Riva Palacio (1803-1880), Mexican politician and lawyer <!- according to his article, his last name is Riva Palacio !-->
 Vicente Riva Palacio (1832-1896), Mexican liberal politician, novelist, and military leader
 Bonvesin della Riva (1240-1313), a well-to-do Milanese lay member of the Ordine degli Umiliati
 Peter Dalla Riva (born 1946), Canadian former football player
 Richard Dalla-Riva (born 1963), Australian politician
 Renato De Riva (1937–1983), Italian speed skater
 Scipione Riva-Rocci (1863-1937), Italian internist, pathologist and pediatrician

References

Italian-language surnames
Surnames of Italian origin